Thomas Mills High School is a secondary school with academy status as well as a sixth form in Framlingham, Suffolk, England. The current Headteacher is Philip J Hurst.

History
The history of the school dates back to the beginning of the 18th century, when local merchant and Baptist philanthropist Thomas Mills stipulated within his will that money from his estate be used to "further the education of the children in Framlingham", and as such the Trustees of Mills' estate eventually established the first Mills School in 1751 on Brook Lane, Framlingham. The School was able to survive for one hundred and fifty years, during that time moving from  Brook Lane to Double Street within the town. The School was then combined for several years, starting in 1878, with the Hitcham School in Framlingham, before becoming separate once again in the form of the Mills Grammar School at the turn of the century. The Hitcham School continuing also, eventually becoming the modern Sir Robert Hitcham Primary School in the town. Opening in 1902 as an independent Grammar school for girls aged 8–16 with a starting total of only twenty five pupils, Mills Grammar School grew over the course of the 20th century, eventually submitting to local authority control in 1921, changing its age provision to 11–18 in 1945 and finally admitting boys to attend the school in the mid-Seventies.

By this time the traditional model of Grammar, Modern and Technical schools had fallen out of favour and local councils were encouraged to form all-admitting comprehensive schools for the purpose of secondary education. As a result of this Mills Grammar School was merged with Framlingham Modern School, established in 1937, beginning in 1976 under the supervision of latter's Headmaster, Michael Brown. Brown became the first Headmaster of the newly formed Thomas Mills High School opening in 1979, which exists on the site of the old Modern School utilising the already existing buildings and facilities, many of which continues to be used today along with many more modern additions. The original charitable trust established by Mills in his will continues to this day in the form of the Mills Charity, which has maintained a relationship with the school and has regularly been involved and contributed financially to projects within it.

Notable alumni
Naomi Watts, actress
Ed Sheeran, singer-songwriter
Tom McRae, singer-songwriter
Josh Webster, racing driver

See also
List of schools in Suffolk

References

Bibliography
Thomasmills.suffolk.sch.uk
Millscharity.co.uk

External links
Thomas Mills High School

Academies in Suffolk
Secondary schools in Suffolk
Framlingham
Educational institutions established in 1751
1751 establishments in England